George Wallace Adams (born December 22, 1962) is a former professional American football running back who played in the National Football League (NFL).

Adams played college football at Kentucky and was a first round pick in the 1985 NFL Draft. Adams played in the NFL for the New York Giants and the New England Patriots.

Adams' son, Jamal, played safety at Louisiana State University. He was picked sixth overall by the New York Jets in the 2017 NFL Draft.

NFL statistics

Regular season

See also

History of the New York Giants (1979-1993)

References

1962 births
Living people
American football running backs
Kentucky Wildcats football players
New England Patriots players
New York Giants players
Players of American football from Lexington, Kentucky